Centre d'Études Universitaires de Zahlé et de la Békaa or CEUZB is a university institution based in the Bekaa Valley of Lebanon. It has been promoting post-secondary French education in the province for over 25 years, and is a sub-department of the USJ (Université Saint-Joseph), originally based in Beirut. It specializes in scientific subjects such as mathematics, physics, and informatics. More than a thousand students attended it in 2005.

The engineering schools École Supérieure des Ingénieurs d'Agronomie Méditerranéenne (ESIAM) and the École Supérieure des Ingénieurs Agro-alimentaires (ESIA) are sister foundations of the CEUZB.

External links 
 CEUZB homepage
 ESIAM-ESIA homepage

Universities in Lebanon
Beqaa Valley